Lee Ho-sung (born 8 March 1968) is a South Korean fencer. He competed in the team foil events at the 1992 Summer Olympics.

References

External links
 

1968 births
Living people
South Korean male foil fencers
Olympic fencers of South Korea
Fencers at the 1992 Summer Olympics
Asian Games medalists in fencing
Fencers at the 1990 Asian Games
Asian Games silver medalists for South Korea
Medalists at the 1990 Asian Games